Christian Theodor Holtfodt (17 October 1863 - 24 February 1930) was a Norwegian officer and a politician for the Liberal Party. He was Minister of Defence 1914–1919. He was said to be "Norway's most independent man", and fought for a strong defence to protect Norwegian neutrality.

References

1863 births
1930 deaths
Defence ministers of Norway